Terror of the Vervoids is the third serial of the larger narrative known as The Trial of a Time Lord which encompasses the whole of the 23rd season of the British science fiction television series Doctor Who. It was first broadcast in four weekly parts on BBC1 from 1 to 22 November 1986. The title Terror of the Vervoids is never used on screen and was first used in relation to these episodes for the 1987 novelisation, with the four episodes that comprise the season being referred to as The Trial of a Time Lord Parts Nine to Twelve. This serial is the first appearance of Bonnie Langford as the companion Mel Bush.

In the serial, the alien time traveller the Sixth Doctor (Colin Baker) is put on trial by his people, the Time Lords, and is accused of meddling in the affairs of other worlds. Much of the story consists of video testimony presented by the Doctor, his own defence, of his own future where the last of a race of plants called Vervoids on board a spaceliner in 2986 plot to wipe out all animal life on board for their own survival.

Plot

As with the other serials from Season 23, Terror of the Vervoids is framed by the trial of the Sixth Doctor, prosecuted by the Valeyard, accusing him of meddling in other species' affairs in a way unbecoming of a Time Lord. In his defence, the Doctor presents evidence through a screen linked to the Matrix, showing the details of his actions on the spaceliner Hyperion III in his own personal future. The bulk of the episode centres on recorded narrative.

On the Hyperion III, an elderly man named Kimber thinks he recognises a fellow passenger as an investigator called Hallett. However, the passenger claims that he is a mineralogist called Grenville. A trio of scientist passengers – Professor Lasky and her colleagues Bruchner and Doland – are alarmed that Grenville might be an investigator.

Edwardes, the communications officer, detects a craft close to the ship – the TARDIS – but is unable to get a reply. Suddenly, an unseen figure attacks him and injects him with a syringe, causing him to fall to sleep. He then uses the communication equipment to send a message to the TARDIS. On board, the Doctor and his new companion, Mel Bush, pick up a Mayday message. They materialise within the Hyperion III's cargo hold, are seized by guards, and are brought before Commodore Travers – whom the Doctor has met before. Travers denies sending a mayday signal, but wants the Doctor and Mel to remain on board. Travers hopes that the Doctor will find out who sent the fake mayday call.

The Doctor is convinced that whoever sent the message wants him on board. Security officer Rudge takes Mel to the ship's gymnasium, where he shows her how to use the headphones and tape recordings to help her exercise. Doland informs Lasky that someone has broken into their Hydroponics centre. As they rush off to find Bruchner, Mel hears someone on her headphones, telling her to take the Doctor to Cabin 6. In the cargo hold, Lasky, Doland and Bruchner check the Hydroponics centre; the large pods inside are stable, but the Demeter seeds have been stolen from the small work cabin. At Cabin 6, the Doctor and Mel find the room has been wrecked and discover the silver Demeter seeds and a single boot.

Rudge contacts Travers to inform him there has been an 'accident' in the waste disposal unit; someone has been thrown inside. All that is left is a boot matching the one found by the Doctor and Mel in Cabin 6. They learn that these belonged to Grenville, but the Doctor does not recognise the name. Mel departs to investigate the hydroponics centre alone.

Mel enters the cargo hold, where she meets Edwardes. He agrees to show her the Hydroponics centre. It was set up for the journey specially for Lasky, Doland and Bruchner, and that only 'low spectrum' light is allowed inside to keep the pods dormant. When Edwardes tries to enter, he is electrocuted, creating bright sparks that activates the pods.

Two guards arrive, and Mel tells them that Edwardes is dead. Later, Doland and Bruchner arrive to find that all the pods have been opened. Rudge brings the Doctor to the bridge to question Mel about being in the Hydroponics centre. Rudge then gets a message from the medical team that was sent down to the hold to collect Edwardes' body, claiming that neither Edwardes nor the guard can be found.

Travers decides to speed up their journey to Earth and has the ship's course altered. Three Mogarians express their concerns that this will take them close to the black hole of Tartarus, but Travers assures them that they will be within adequate safety margins. Later, one of the Mogarians collapses. The Doctor attempts to remove the figure's face plate, but the others protest that oxygen is lethal to a Mogarian. The Doctor believes it is not a Mogarian, and removes the face plate to reveal that it is Grenville. The Doctor, however, recognises the man as Hallett, an undercover investigator. When Kimber recalls recognising Hallett before, the Doctor guesses that Hallett faked his death in the waste disposal unit to avoid being discovered.

Mel realises that the Demeter seeds left in the wrecked cabin were a clue to lead them to the Hydroponics centre. They look at the place, and the Doctor wonders what came out of the pods. Returning to the passenger quarters, they see Lasky leaving a guarded Isolation Room. The Doctor and Mel enter the room, where they find a half-human, half-plant hybrid strapped to a table. The creature implores them to stop Lasky, but Lasky, Bruchner and Doland sedate her. Doland tells the time travellers that the creature is his assistant, Ruth Baxter. During their experiments involving cross-fertilisation, pollen penetrated a scratch in Ruth's thumb, causing the resulting plant maturing process to partially transform her human body. They are taking her to Earth in the hope that they can reverse the infection.

Mel hears a noise in the air conditioning ducts and overhears creatures planning to kill all the 'animal-kind' on the ship. As she listens, she is attacked and rendered unconscious. The murderer dumps her in a disposal trolley. The Doctor enters the gym and hears the recording, including her scream when she was attacked. The Doctor runs after the trolley and rescues her.

Bruchner is becoming increasingly hysterical about the situation with the Hydroponics centre, especially when Kimber disappears. It turns out that he, Edwardes and the missing guard have been killed by plant-like creatures called Vervoids – the creatures that came out of the pods when Edwardes was electrocuted. Lasky finds Bruchner burning the notes on their work in the Hydroponics centre's small work cabin, and tries unsuccessfully to reason with him. Bruchner knocks Lasky out, runs off and attacks a guard, taking his gun. He goes to the bridge, and forces Travers and the pilot to leave, then changes the course of the Hyperion to head into the black hole of Tartarus – planning to destroy the ship, and therefore kill the Vervoids.

The Doctor, Lasky and Travers attempt to break into the bridge, but it is filled with marsh gas. This has been released into the bridge by the Vervoids, who learned that they are the only members of their species. Bruchner is killed by the gas, but the ship is still heading into the black hole. Rudge summons the two Mogarians, as they can breathe in the poisonous atmosphere. They direct the ship away from the black hole, but when it is safe, Rudge tells Travers that he and the Mogarians are taking over the ship.

Mel warns Doland and Janet of the hijacking. Rudge tells the Doctor that the Mogarians are trying to regain the supply of metals stored in the vault. Rudge is taking the hijacking as a means of securing a "more comfortable retirement", as this Mogar-Earth journey was to be his last voyage as a security officer before being written off. On the bridge, an unknown assailant kills the Mogarians.

Mel sneaks through the air ducts to let the Doctor know that the guards will attack the lounge. The Doctor believes this is too risky, and tells her to attack the bridge instead. When they arrive, they find the Mogarians dead, and take the face plates to prove to Rudge the hijack is over. Doland knocks the gun from Rudge's hands, and he runs into the corridors, but is killed by the Vervoids.

The Doctor tells Travers about the stolen tape recording and requests permission to search the passenger cabins. While Mel checks Lasky's locker in the gym, the Doctor tells Doland that he thinks the traitor is either him or Lasky. After searching the professor's cabin, Doland suggests the cabinet in the Hydroponics centre work cabin. There, Doland reveals the tape is in his pocket, but that he has wiped it. Taking the Doctor's gun, Doland admits to the murders. Doland believes the Vervoids can be used as slave labor when brought to Earth.  The Doctor has disarmed the gun, and Travers arrives and arrests Doland. However, he and his guard are attacked and killed by the Vervoids.

The Doctor, Mel, Travers and Lasky meet to discuss the Vervoids. Lasky believes that something must have gone wrong with their DNA, but the Doctor tells them that the Vervoids' hostility towards them is instinctive: The Vervoids hate 'animal-kind' and kill for survival. Lasky realises that this is what made Bruchner so hysterical, and vows to help destroy the creatures.

In the hydroponics centre, Lasky finds that the chemicals to create herbicide had been taken by the Vervoids. She, Mel and the Doctor are surrounded by the plants. Lasky tries to reason with them, but they kill her and take her body back to their lair. Escaping through the air ducts, Mel and the Doctor discover the pile of bodies.

The Doctor has an idea that vionesium, the rare metal taken from Mogar stored in the ship's vault, would accelerate the Vervoids' life-cycle towards its natural end. Travers lowers the lighting and heating in the ship, forcing the Vervoids back to their lair, where the Doctor and Mel are waiting. They deploy the metal against the Vervoids, which causes the creatures' leaf-covered bodies to die. Having saved the survivors, the Doctor and Mel depart in the TARDIS.

Back in the courtroom, the Inquisitor asks the Doctor if any of the Vervoids survived, and he informs her that none did; if even a leaf had survived and reached Earth, a Vervoid would have grown. Seizing on this, the Valeyard accuses the Doctor of committing genocide.

Production

Preproduction
This story segment of Trial went through a number of commissions with writers including David Halliwell & Jack Trevor Story (working on separate but linked episodes), Christopher H. Bidmead and Peter J. Hammond, the creator of the cult science-fiction fantasy series Sapphire & Steel. Hammond's story outline, titled Paradise Five, was liked by script editor Eric Saward but disliked by producer John Nathan-Turner, who rejected it and commissioned Pip and Jane Baker to do the segment instead. Nathan-Turner also was displeased with the appearance of the Vervoids, likening them to labia. Hammond later wrote two episodes of the Doctor Who spin-off drama, Torchwood.

Designed as a typical Agatha Christie murder mystery set on a space liner, the actual structure of the story (and its bubbly tone) are reminiscent of the series during Douglas Adams' tenure as script editor, during season seventeen. In the first episode, Professor Lasky is briefly seen reading a copy of Christie's Murder on the Orient Express.

Post-production
This serial marked the last time the BBC Radiophonic Workshop provided a music score for the series. Elizabeth Parker was initially assigned the episode, but some schedule shifts meant it ended up being done by Malcolm Clarke instead. Coincidentally, Clarke had done the Radiophonic Workshop's first Doctor Who score, for The Sea Devils.

As no individual title was used onscreen or on the final scripts for this story, there has been some confusion over how to refer to the story. It was initially commissioned with the title of The Ultimate Foe. However this title was later given to the novelisation of the 13th and 14th parts of the season. Writers Pip and Jane Baker repeatedly referred to the story as The Vervoids in subsequent interviews, as have other production team members, but this title does not appear to exist on any contemporary documentation. When Target Books published Pip and Jane Baker's novelisation, it was under the title of Terror of the Vervoids, which is now generally used to refer to the story (see The Ultimate Foe).

Cast notes
Honor Blackman later played Anahita in the Fifth Doctor audio drama The Children of Seth.

Commercial releases

In print

A novelisation of this serial, written by Pip and Jane Baker, was published by Target Books in September 1987.

Home media
Terror of the Vervoids was released on VHS as part of the three-tape The Trial of a Time Lord set in October 1993. It was released on DVD in September 2008, again boxed with the other three stories of Season 23, and was released individually as part of the Doctor Who DVD Files in Issue 131 on 8 January 2014. Season 23 was released on Blu-ray on 23 September 2019; the release contained the broadcast version of the story, an extended cut of all four episodes and a "standalone edition".

References

External links

Target novelisation

On Target – Terror of the Vervoids

Doctor Who serials novelised by Pip and Jane Baker
Sixth Doctor serials
1986 British television episodes
Fiction set in the 30th century
Television episodes written by Pip and Jane Baker